James Sankey Martin was the general superintendent of the National Reform Association who led an anti-Mormon crusade in 1913–1914.

Writings
The Anti-Mormon Crusade

19th-century births
20th-century deaths
American evangelicals
Critics of Mormonism